Eucalyptus relicta is a species of mallee that is endemic to a small area in the south west of Western Australia. It has rough bark on the trunk and branches, lance-shaped to curved adult leaves, flower buds in groups of between seven and thirteen and hemispherical to conical or cup-shaped fruit.

Description
The bark on the trunk and branches is thick, dark grey and fissured. Young plants and coppice regrowth have egg-shaped, pointed leaves. Flowering occurs from January to February but the flower colour is not known.

Taxonomy and naming
Eucalyptus relicta was first formally described in 2004 by Stephen Hopper and Greg Wardell-Johnson in the journal Nuytsia from material collected near Sabina Road in the Whicher Range in 1993. The specific epithet (relicta) is from the Latin relictus, meaning "left behind", and "refers to the phlogenetic and landscape position of the species".

Distribution and habitat
This eucalypt is only known from two populations along creeklines on upper, undulating slopes in the Whicher Range.

Conservation status
This tree is classified as "Priority Two" by the Western Australian Government Department of Parks and Wildlife meaning that it is poorly known and from only one or a few locations.

See also
List of Eucalyptus species

References

Eucalypts of Western Australia
Trees of Australia
relicta
Myrtales of Australia
Plants described in 2004
Taxa named by Stephen Hopper